Sofla Rural District is a rural district (dehestan) in the Central District of Kharameh County, Fars Province, Iran. At the 2006 census, its population was 6,618, in 1,611 families.  The rural district has 17 villages.

References 

Rural Districts of Fars Province
Kharameh County